The Education Justice Project is a project of the University of Illinois at Urbana–Champaign to "build a model college-in-prison program that demonstrates the positive impacts of higher education upon incarcerated people, their families, the communities from which they come, the host institution, and society as a whole." It was founded in 2006 by Education professor Rebecca Ginsburg. Since 2009, the program has provided classes to more than 220 incarcerated people, primarily at Danville Correctional Center.

Funding 
The three sources of funds for the project are the University of Illinois, grants, and private donations. Approximately 25% of the donations they receive are from private donations. The estimated value of donated time on the part of faculty, graduate students, staff, and community members amounted to more than $200,000. Professors and grad students are not paid for teaching in the program - the program is volunteer-based.

In 2017, the project received a $1 million grant from the Andrew W. Mellon Foundation. The funding will go toward developing a men's college-in-prison program at Danville Correctional Facility, along with further course offerings at a nearby women's prison, a new speaker's series, and an effort to improve the evaluation process of the program.

Impact 
As of 2019, more than 220 people have taken classes through the program, including an estimated 5 students now in grad school.

Criticisms 
One of the main criticisms of the program is that although students can earn credits that are transferable to a full degree program at a college or university, the program does not directly enable participants to earn a bachelor's degree. Additionally, Ginsburg acknowledges that the program needs "a better way to measure [its] success."

See also
Carol Symes

References

University of Illinois Urbana-Champaign
Education in Illinois
Adult education
Prisons in Illinois